Coreidae is a large family of predominantly sap-sucking insects in the Hemipteran suborder Heteroptera.  The name "Coreidae" derives from the genus Coreus, which derives from the Ancient Greek  meaning bedbug.

As a family, the Coreidae are cosmopolitan, but most of the species are tropical or subtropical.

Common names and significance
The common names of the Coreidae vary regionally. Leaf-footed bug refers to leaf-like expansions on the legs of some species, generally on the hind tibiae. In North America,  the pest status of species such as Anasa tristis on squash plants and other cucurbits gave rise to the name squash bugs. The Coreidae are called twig-wilters or tip-wilters in parts of Africa and Australia because many species feed on young twigs, injecting enzymes that macerate the tissues of the growing tips and cause them to wilt abruptly.

Morphology and appearance
The Coreidae commonly are oval-shaped, with antennae composed of four segments, numerous veins in the membrane of the fore wings, and externally visible repugnatorial stink glands. They vary in size from 7 to 45 mm long, which implies that the family includes some of the biggest species of Heteroptera. The body shape is quite variable; some species are broadly oval, others are elongated with parallel sides, and a few are slender. Many species with the "leaf-footed" tibiae are very slender with conspicuous expansions of the hind tibiae, but some robust species also have decided expansions. Some species are covered with spines and tubercles. As an example of these, the tribe Phyllomorphini Mulsant & Rey, 1870, are strikingly aberrant, with thin legs, spiny bristles, and laciniate outlines and adornments.

Many of the more robust species have grossly enlarged, thickened, and bowed hind femora armed with spikes on the inner edge, and with hind tibiae to match, though the enlargement of the tibiae is less exaggerated.

In the nymphs, the openings of the two repugnatorial stink glands of the Coreidae are visible as two projections or spots on the medial line of the dorsal surface of the abdomen, one at the anterior and one at the posterior edge of the fifth abdominal tergite above the glands inside. During the final ecdysis, the anatomy is rearranged and the glands end up in the metathorax, opening laterally through ostioles between the mesothoracic and metathoracic pleura.

Biology and habits
The Coreidae generally feed on the sap of plants. Some species reportedly are actively carnivorous, but material evidence is lacking, and in the field, some are easy to confuse with some species of the Reduviidae, so doubt has been cast on the veracity  of the claims.

Some Coreidae, such as Phyllomorpha laciniata, exhibit parental care by carrying their eggs. This behaviour significantly improves the eggs' chances of avoiding the attacks of parasitoids.

Taxonomy and systematics
The Coreidae are placed in the order Hemiptera and closely related to the families Alydidae, Hyocephalidae, Rhopalidae, and Stenocephalidae. Together, these five families form the superfamily Coreoidea. The family is large, with more than 1,900 species in over 270 genera.

Most taxonomists dealing with the Coreidae divide the family into three or sometimes four subfamilies. Numerous tribes of the Coreinae have previously been proposed for elevation to subfamily rank, for example, the Agriopocorini, Colpurini, Hydarini, Phyllomorphini, and Procamptini, but the only one of these changes that at least a significant minority of researchers currently accept is the elevation of the Agriopocorinae, and recent reviews tend to treat them as a tribe again, recognizing only the three subfamilies known by 1867. Another difficulty is that the genus Eubule has not yet been placed.

The family has been demonstrated to be non-monophyletic, as Hydarinae and Pseudophloeinae are more closely related to Alydidae than to other coreids.

Accordingly, the subfamilies are as follows, together with illustrative genera of each:

Coreinae Leach, 1815

 Acanthocephala  Laporte, 1833
 Acanthocerus  Palisot, 1818
 Althos Kirkaldy, 1904
 Amblyomia Stål, 1870
 Amblypelta Stål, 1873
 Anasa Amyot & Serville, 1843
 Canungrantmictis Brailovsky, 2002
 Catorhintha Stål, 1859
 Chariesterus Laporte, 1833
 Chelinidea Uhler, 1863
 Chondrocera Laporte, 1832
 Cimolus Stål, 1862
 Coreus Leach, 1815
 Dalader Amyot & Serville, 1843
 Dallacoris Osuna, 1981
 Elasmopoda   Stål, 1873
 Euthochtha  Mayr, 1865
 Ficana Stål, 1862
 Helcomeria Stål, 1873
 Holhymenia Lepeletier & Serville, 1825
 Hypselonotus Hahn, 1833
 Leptoglossus Guérin-Méneville, 1831 – conifer seed bugs
 Madura Stål, 1860
 Mamurius Stål, 1862
 Menenotus Laporte, 1832
 Mictis Leach, 1814
 Mozena Amyot & Serville, 1843
 Namacus Amyot & Serville, 1843
 Narnia Stål, 1862
 Nisoscolopocerus Barber, 1928
 Pephricus Amyot & Serville, 1843
 Phthia Stål, 1862
 Phyllomorpha  Laporte 1833 
 Plectropoda  Bergroth, 1894 
 Piezogaster Amyot & Serville, 1843
 Sagotylus Mayr, 1865
 Savius Stål, 1862
 Scolopocerus Uhler, 1875
 Sephina Amyot & Serville, 1843
 Sethenira Spinola, 1837
 Spartocera  Laporte, 1833
 Thasus Stål, 1865
 Zicca Amyot & Serville, 1843

Agriopocorinae Miller, 1953 (often included in Coreinae)
 Agriopocoris Miller, 1953

Meropachyinae Stål, 1867
 Merocoris Perty, 1833

Pseudophloeinae Stål, 1867
 Bothrostethus Fieber 1860
 Ceraleptus Costa, 1847
 Coriomeris Westwood, 1842

Gallery

References

External links

 Coreidae of Britain
 Coreidae of Florida
 Comparative description of the immature stages of two very similar leaf footed bugs, Holymenia clavigera (Herbst) and Anisoscelis foliacea marginella (Dallas) (Hemiptera, Coreidae, Anisoscelini)
 Coreidae (Heteroptera: Pentatomomorpha) 
    Chelinidea vittiger aequoris, a cactus bug,
   Euthochtha galeator
   Leptoscelis tricolor, heliconia bug
   Leptoglossus phyllopus
   Spartocera batatas, giant sweetpotato bug

 
Heteroptera families